On 11 September 2018, a suicide bomber detonated explosives in a crowd of protesters in the eastern Afghan city of Jalalabad, killing 68 people and injuring over 150 others.

Perpetrators 
Nobody immediately claimed responsibility for the bombing, with the Taliban denying any involvement. Government officials suspected ISIL-KP to be involved, due to an increase in activity by the group in the months prior to the bombing.

Responses 
The United Nations condemned the attack and expressed their deepest condolences to the victims, urging Afghan officials "to combat by all means, threats to international peace and security caused by terrorist acts".

References 

Suicide bombings in 2018
Mass murder in 2018
Islamic terrorist incidents in 2018
Attacks in Asia in 2018
Suicide bombings in Afghanistan